Bertinelli is a surname, of Italian origin. Notable people with the surname include:

 Valerie Bertinelli (born 1960), American actress
 Samuele Bertinelli (born 1976), Italian politician
 Helena Bertinelli, a fictional character.

Italian-language surnames